William Jesus Contreras (born December 24, 1997) is a Venezuelan professional baseball catcher for the Milwaukee Brewers of Major League Baseball (MLB). He has previously played in MLB for the Atlanta Braves.

Contreras signed with the Braves organization in 2015 and made his major league debut on Opening Day in 2020. Contreras was a member of the 2021 World Series champions and was named an All-Star in 2022. The Braves traded Contreras to the Brewers after the 2022 season.

Career

Atlanta Braves
Contreras signed with the Atlanta Braves as an international free agent in February 2015. He made his professional debut with the DSL Braves in 2015, hitting .314/.370/.413/.783 with 32 runs batted in (RBIs). He played for the GCL Braves in 2016 and hit .264/.346/.375/.721 with one home run and eight RBIs.

Contreras played for the Danville Braves in 2017, hitting .290/.379/.432/.811 with four home runs and 25 RBIs. He split the 2018 season between the Rome Braves and the Florida Fire Frogs, hitting a combined .285/.347/.436/.783 with 11 home runs and 49 RBIs. He split the 2019 season between Florida and the Mississippi Braves, hitting a combined .255/.315/.354/.669 with 6 home runs and 39 RBIs.

The Braves added Contreras to their 40 man roster following the 2019 season to protect him from being eligible in the Rule 5 draft. He was invited to the regularly held 2020 spring training, as well as summer camp, held prior to opening day of the shortenend 2020 season. Contreras was activated on July 24, 2020, and made his major league debut that day as a backup catcher. His first career hit and run batted in came as a pinch-hitter the next day, while facing Hunter Strickland. In 2020 he was four-for-ten with a double and an RBI.

On May 5, 2021, Contreras hit his first career home run against Washington Nationals pitcher Erick Fedde. He split the 2021 between Gwinnett and Atlanta. While in the majors, he batted .215/.303/.399 with eight home runs and 23 RBIs. The Braves finished with an 88–73 record, clinching the NL East, and eventually won the 2021 World Series, giving the Braves their first title since 1995.

Contreras made the Atlanta Braves' 2022 Opening Day roster as a backup catcher, and again split the year between Atlanta and Gwinnett, where he was expected to improve his skills as a catcher. Contreras was named to the 2022 Major League Baseball All-Star Game as an injury replacement for designated hitter Bryce Harper. William and his brother Willson became the fifteenth pair of brothers to be selected to an All-Star Game.

Milwaukee Brewers
On December 12, 2022, the Braves sent Contreras to the Milwaukee Brewers in a three-team trade in which the Braves acquired Sean Murphy, the Brewers also acquired Joel Payamps and Justin Yeager, and the Oakland Athletics acquired Esteury Ruiz, Kyle Muller, Freddy Tarnok, Manny Piña, and Royber Salinas.

Personal life
William Contreras is the youngest son of William and Olga Contreras. His older brother, Willson, is also a catcher and plays for the St. Louis Cardinals.

References

External links

1997 births
Living people
Major League Baseball players from Venezuela
Major League Baseball catchers
Atlanta Braves players
National League All-Stars
Dominican Summer League Braves players
Venezuelan expatriate baseball players in the Dominican Republic
Gulf Coast Braves players
Danville Braves players
Rome Braves players
Florida Fire Frogs players
Mississippi Braves players
Venezuelan expatriate baseball players in the United States
Gwinnett Stripers players
People from Puerto Cabello